The 2019 elections for Tamil Nadu's 39 seats in the 17th Lok Sabha were held on 18 April, in the second phase of the 2019 Indian general elections. The alliance led by the Dravida Munnetra Kazhagam, won a landslide victory, taking 38 of the 39 seats.  
 
ECI has announced that the by-election (2016–21 Tamil Nadu Legislative Assembly by-elections) for 18 assembly constituencies together with the general elections (18 constituencies polling date – 18.04.2019 and 4 Constituencies – 19.05.2019). The counting of votes was held on 23 May and results were published on the same day.
 
There are 39 Lok Sabha constituencies in Tamil Nadu, with an average of 1.51 million voters in each one.

Opinion polls

Exit Polls

Voters Turnout 

Highest turnout in Dharmapuri constituency of 82.41% and the lowest is in Chennai South constituency of 57.07%.

Results

Constituency-wise Turnout & Quick results

Coalition wise result

By Alliance 

|-
! style="background-color:#E9E9E9" colspan=2 |Alliance/Party
! style="background-color:#E9E9E9;text-align:right;" |Seats won
! style="background-color:#E9E9E9;text-align:right;" |Change
! style="background-color:#E9E9E9;text-align:right;" |Popular Vote
! style="background-color:#E9E9E9;text-align:right;" |Vote %
|-
! colspan=2 style="text-align:center;vertical-align:middle;background-color:"|SPA
|38
|+38
|22,789,020
|53.15%
|-
|DMK
! style="background-color: "|
|24
| +24
|14,363,332
|33.52%
|-
|INC
! style="background-color: "|
|8
| +8
|5,405,674
|12.61%
|-
|CPI
! style="background-color: "|
|2
| +2
|1,031,617
|2.4%
|-
|CPI(M)
! style="background-color: "|
|2
| +2
|1,018,225
|2.37%
|-
|VCK
! style="background-color: "|
|1
| +1
|500,229
|1.16%
|-
|IUML
! style="background-color: "|
|1
| +1
|469,943
|1.09%
|-
! colspan=2 style="text-align:center;vertical-align:middle;background-color:"|NDA
|1
|-38
|13,307,139
|30.57%
|-
|AIADMK
! style="background-color:" |
|1
| -36
|8,307,345
|19.39%
|-
|PMK
! style="background-color:" |
|0
| -1
|2,297,431
|5.36%
|-
|BJP
! style="background-color:" |
|0
| -1
|1,551,924
|3.66%
|-
|DMDK
! style="background-color:" |
|0
|0
|929,590
|2.16%
|-
|TMC(M)
! style="background-color:" |
|0
|0
|220,749
|
|}

Detailed results 
Constituency-wise results:

Assembly segments wise lead of Parties

See also 
 Elections in Tamil Nadu

Notes

References

Further reading 
 

Tamil
Indian general elections in Tamil Nadu
2010s in Tamil Nadu